al-Malik al-Afdal Najm al-Dīn Ayyūb ibn Shādhi ibn Marwān ( Kurdish: Necmeddin Eyûbî) (died August 9, 1173) was a Kurdish soldier and politician from Dvin, and the father of Saladin. He is the eponymous ancestor of the Ayyubid dynasty.

Life and career

Ayyub was the son of Shadhi ibn Marwan and brother of Shirkuh. The family belonged to the tribe of Revend or Revendi, also Kurdish Rawadiya, itself a branch of the Hadhabani tribe. The earliest form of the name is written "Rewend" in the Sharafnama.  According to Vladimir Minorsky, this could have been a corruption of the Arabic name "Rawadiya". In contrast, the name of "Rewend" or in some cases "Revend" means "Nomad" in Kurdish and this name was mostly applied to nomad Kurdish tribes in the region.  Minorsky thus leaves space for a possible Arabic influence on the tribe, although they are generally considered to be Kurdish. Furthermore, Minorsky states that the rulers of the tribe could have given their name to it.  In other words, it is possible that the Rewend/Rawadiya rulers were of Arab origin, and arrived in the Dvin region in 758 CE from the Arbela (modern Arbil) region, whereas we know that many rulers claimed of Arabic origin despite not being Arab or historians claimed as such. The full name of Saladin is "Al-Malik al-Nasir Salah al-Din Abu'l Muzzafar Yusuf ibn Ayyub al-Tikriti al-Kurdi", which clearly shows that Najm al-Din Ayyub and Saladin were Kurdish, "al-Kurdi" refers to his Kurdish ethnic origin. Most of their loyal companians as well as jurists were from the Kurdish region of Hakkari also known as Colemerg or Julamerk in some western history books. Further it should be considered that Vladimir Minorsky's research was based upon subjective writings of Kurdish medieval historian Ibn Athir.

The family were closely connected to the Shaddadid dynasty, and when the last Shaddadid was deposed in Dvin in 1130, Shadhi moved the family first to Baghdad and then to Tikrit, where he was appointed governor by the regional administrator Bihruz. Ayyub succeeded his father as governor of Tikrit when Shadhi died soon after.

In 1132 Ayyub was in the service of Imad al-Din Zengi. He participated in a battle against the Seljuk Sultan near Tikrit and saved Zengi's life when he assisted his retreat across the Tigris. In 1136, Shirkuh killed a Christian with whom he was quarrelling in Tikrit, and the brothers were exiled (Ayyub's son Yusuf, later known as Saladin, was supposedly born the night they left). Zengi later appointed Ayyub governor of Baalbek, and when the town was besieged in 1146 by Mu'in al-Din Unur, the atabeg of the Burid emir of Damascus, Ayyub surrendered Baalbek and retired to Damascus. Shirkuh, meanwhile, entered the service of Zengi's son Nur al-Din Zengi, who had designs on Damascus; when the Second Crusade besieged the city in 1148, Nur al-Din forced Mu'in al-Din and the Burids into a reluctant alliance. Soon Nur al-Din demanded the city be handed over to him, and Ayyub and Shirkuh negotiated its surrender in 1154. Ayyub remained governor of Damascus under Nur al-Din's rule. He was held in such honour that he was the only one of Nur al-Din's officials allowed to remain seated in his presence.

Ayyub's son Saladin also took up service with Nur al-Din, and he was sent to Egypt to take control in Nur al-Din's name during the period of joint crusader-Byzantine invasions. In 1170 Ayyub joined him there, either summoned by Saladin himself, or sent by Nur al-Din to convince Saladin to depose the last Fatimid caliph. Saladin offered the vizierate to him, but he refused, and instead was granted Alexandria, Damietta, and al-Buhayrah as personal fiefs. Many of Saladin's other relatives also joined him in Egypt. Nur al-Din did not trust Saladin and his family, correctly assuming that they were consolidating power against him; Ayyub publicly supported Nur al-Din, but privately warned his son that Nur al-Din should never be allowed to take Egypt from him.

Death

Najm al-Din Ayyub was injured in a horse riding accident on July 31, 1173, and died on August 9. His death exacerbated the tension between Saladin and Nur al-Din; the latter had summoned the former to assist in an expedition against the Kingdom of Jerusalem, but Saladin returned home when he heard of his father's death. However the expected confrontation between Nur al-Din and Saladin did not occur, as Nur al-Din died the next year, and Saladin eventually took control of the whole of Egypt and Syria.

According to Baha al-Din ibn Shaddad, Ayyub was "a noble, generous man, mild and of excellent character." He was also "passionately fond of polo". Ibn al-Qalanisi calls him "a man of resolution, intelligence and knowledge of affairs", who prudently handed over Baalbek to a superior force in return for rewards and honours.

His given name was Ayyub (Job), from which comes the Ayyubid dynasty of Saladin and his successors. Najm al-Din is an honorific meaning "star of the faith".

Family and children
Ayyub had several children:
Nur al-Din Shahanshah (died 1148)
al-Malik al-Mu'azzam Shams al-Dawla Turan-Shah (died 1181)
Salah al-Din Yusuf (Saladin) (1137–1193)
al-Malik al-Adil Sayf al-Din Abu Bakr Ahmad (Saphadin) (1145–1218)
Taj al-Muluk Abu Sa'id Buri (died 1184)
al-Malik al-'Aziz Sayf al-Islam Tughtekin (died 1197)
 Rabi'a Khatun (daughter, d. 1246), married (1) Amir Sa'd al-Din Mas'ud b. Mu'in al-Din Onor, and 
 Sitt Ash-Sham Fatima Khatun (daughter)

References

Sources
Baha al-Din ibn Shaddad, The Rare and Excellent History of Saladin, ed. D. S. Richards, Ashgate, 2002.
The Damascus Chronicle of the Crusades, Extracted and Translated from the Chronicle of Ibn al-Qalanisi. H.A.R. Gibb, 1932 (reprint, Dover Publications, 2002)
Vladimir Minorsky, "The Prehistory of Saladin", in Studies in Caucasian History, Cambridge University Press, 1957, pp. 124–132. (available online)
 
P. M. Holt, The Age of the Crusades: The Near East from the Eleventh Century to 1517, Longman, 1986.

1173 deaths
Kurdish Muslims
People from the Ayyubid Sultanate
Generals of the medieval Islamic world
Deaths by horse-riding accident
Year of birth unknown
Kurdish military personnel
12th-century Muslims
12th-century Kurdish people
Saladin